Mark Kinsey Stephenson is an American-born actor most famous for his role as Randolph Carter in the H.P. Lovecraft film adaptation named The Unnamable and its sequel The Unnamable II: The Statement of Randolph Carter; the latter covered the whole of Lovecraft's story, The Statement of Randolph Carter, in about ten minutes.

Biography

Career
Although Mark Kinsey Stephenson played the lead role in The Unnamable and its sequel, it almost wasn't to be on the grounds that he wasn't 'cosmetically suited' for a lead role. In other words, he was deemed a little less good looking than your average star. The director, Jean-Paul Oullette, fought for his lead spot in the film and won, which proved to be a successful move and the films quickly earned the respect of many a teenager worried about what the opposite sex think of their looks.

Since then Stephenson has had very few roles, mostly very minor roles. He also has writing in his credits as he wrote Someone is Watching for television in 2000. Mark is still active in the industry, but is scarcely given any work nowadays.

Filmography
The Unnamable (1988) - Randolph Carter
Servants of Twilight (1991) - Gunman at House
The Unnamable II: The Statement of Randolph Carter (1993) - Randolph Carter
Where Evil Lies (1995) - David
Domino (2005) - Catholic Teacher
Night of the Templar (2009) - Limo Driver

As writer:
Someone Is Watching (2000)

External links
 https://www.imdb.com/name/nm0827291/
 https://web.archive.org/web/20090604171343/http://www.fandango.com/markkinseystephenson/filmography/p68013
 http://www.lastageblog.com/author/mark-kinsey-stephenson/

Year of birth missing (living people)
Living people
American male film actors